Kenneth Mars (April 4, 1935 – February 12, 2011) was an American actor. He appeared in two Mel Brooks films: as the deranged Nazi playwright Franz Liebkind in The Producers (1967) and Police Inspector Hans Wilhelm Friedrich Kemp in Young Frankenstein (1974). He also appeared in Peter Bogdanovich's What's Up Doc? (1972), and Woody Allen's Radio Days (1987), and Shadows and Fog (1991). 

Mars appeared in two seasons of Malcolm in the Middle as Otto Mannkusser, Francis's well-meaning but dimwitted boss and a German immigrant who owns a dude ranch. He voiced King Triton, Ariel's father, in the 1989 Disney animated film The Little Mermaid and its sequel, as well as its companion television series, and the Kingdom Hearts series. He also did several other animated voice-over film roles such as Littlefoot's grandfather in the Land Before Time series (up to 2008) and that of Professor Screweyes in We're Back! A Dinosaur's Story (1993), and King Colbert (Prince Cornelius's father) in Thumbelina (1994). He also the voice of Tuskernini from Darkwing Duck (1991-1992).

Early life
Mars was born in Chicago. His father, Bernard "Sonny" Mars, was a radio and television personality. Kenneth studied fine arts and acting at Northwestern University.

Career
Mars made his acting debut in 1962 as a book publisher on Car 54, Where Are You?. He later appeared on such television series as Gunsmoke, Get Smart, McMillan & Wife, Columbo, and The Bob Crane Show. He also appeared in dramatic roles such as Will Turner, a former FBI agent, in Warren Beatty's The Parallax View. 
 
Mars played Harry Zarakartos on the Richard Benjamin-Paula Prentiss 1967 CBS-TV sitcom He & She. He was featured in a number of small roles in broadcasts such as the Misfits of Science pilot episode and the Star Trek: Deep Space Nine episode "Shadowplay". He was cast opposite Bette Davis in Hello Mother, Goodbye!, a 1973 television pilot aired by NBC but never picked up as a series. From 1970 to 1974, Mars guest starred in five episodes of Love, American Style, playing various characters.

In 1977, Mars became a series regular on both the Sha Na Na variety series and on Norman Lear's talk show parody Fernwood 2-Night in the memorable recurring  role of eccentric William W.D. 'Bud' Prize, from the Fernwood Chamber of Commerce. He continued the role on the revamped America 2-Night in 1978. In 2001, Mars portrayed a comedic famous but washed-up photographer on Just Shoot Me. Before his death, his final television roles were Otto, the German dude ranch owner on Fox Broadcasting Company's Malcolm in the Middle, an appearance on Disney Channel's Hannah Montana, and a reprise of his role as Grandpa Longneck in The Land Before Time television series.

In 1969, Mars portrayed a marshal trying to raise a posse to pursue Butch Cassidy and the Sundance Kid, only to have his address to the townsfolk hijacked by a friendly bicycle salesman. Mars frequently played characters with exaggerated accents. He portrayed German characters in The Producers (1967) and Young Frankenstein (1974), and played a Croatian musicologist, Hugh Simon, in What's Up, Doc? (1972). His first broadly accented character was that of Sir Evelyn Oakleigh in the 1962 Off-Broadway revival of the Cole Porter musical Anything Goes. He also appeared in the 1962 Broadway play The Affair.

In 1975, ABC/Dunhill released a comedy LP produced by Earl Doud, Henry the First, featuring Mars in a number of comedy bits as Henry Kissinger, including a cover version of the Bachman–Turner Overdrive song, "Takin' Care of Business".

Mars cultivated a lengthy voice acting career, launching it by voicing several characters on Uncle Croc's Block. He voiced the roles of Ariel's father King Triton in The Little Mermaid and in the video games Kingdom Hearts and Kingdom Hearts II.

He voiced Littlefoot's Grandpa Longneck in The Land Before Time series of films and the spin-off television series, and the villainous Professor Screweyes in We're Back! A Dinosaur's Story. He played some minor roles on the popular radio show, Adventures in Odyssey. He played Sweet William in Fievel's American Tails, which took place after An American Tail: Fievel Goes West. He voiced characters on many animated television series, such as The Smurfs, The Biskitts, A Pup Named Scooby-Doo, TaleSpin, and Animaniacs, as well as video games such as Fallout and Kingdom Hearts.

In 2008, Mars retired from acting after being diagnosed with pancreatic cancer two years prior. His final performance was as Grandpa Longneck in the animated television series The Land Before Time.

Personal life
In 1977, Mars married Barbara Newborn. They had two daughters, Susannah and Rebecca. The marriage lasted until his death in 2011.

Illness and death
In 2006, Mars was diagnosed with pancreatic cancer that had already spread beyond his pancreas. His cancer made him so ill that he could not reprise his role as King Triton for The Little Mermaid: Ariel's Beginning, so Jim Cummings took over the role. As well as not being able to voice Triton, he could not voice Grandpa Longneck in The Land Before Time XIII: The Wisdom of Friends (Littlefoot’s Grandpa does appear in the film, but has no lines) and couldn't return to reprise his role as Otto in season 6 of Malcolm in the Middle.

He died from the disease on February 12, 2011, at the age of 75.

Filmography

Film

Television

 Gunsmoke (1967) Robber Clyde Hayes
 The Ghost & Mrs. Muir (1968-1970, TV series) as Joshua T. Albertson / Ellsworth Gordon (2 episodes)
 He & She (1967–1968, TV series) as Harry Zarakartos
 Guess Who's Sleeping in My Bed? (1973, TV series) as Mitchell Bernard
 The New Original Wonder Woman (pilot) (1975, TV series) as Colonel Oberst Von Blasko (1 episode)
 It's a Bird...It's a Plane...It's Superman (1975, TV special) as Max Mencken
 Fernwood 2 Night (1977, TV series) as William W.D. "Bud" Prize (8 episodes)
 Baa Baa Black Sheep (1977, TV series) as Harold French
 America 2-Night (1978, TV series) as William W.D. "Bud" Prize
 Heaven Only Knows (1979, TV series)
 Carol Burnett & Company (1979, TV series)
 Hart to Hart (1980, TV series)
 The Smurfs (1981 TV series) as King Bullrush (voice)
 Yellowbeard (1983) as Mr. Crisp / Verdugo
 The Biskitts (1983) as King Max (voice)
 The New Scooby-Doo Mysteries (1983) as Orson Kane
 Prince Jack (1984) as Lyndon B. Johnson
 Protocol (1984) as Lou
 Fletch (1985) as Stanton Boyd
 Beer (1985) as Adolphe Norbecker
 Misfits of Science (TV) (1985) as Sen. Donner
 The Adventures of the American Rabbit (1986) as Walt / Vultor the Buzzard (voice)
 Radio Days (1987) as Rabbi Baumel
 A Pup Named Scooby-Doo (1988–1991, TV series) as Dogcatcher Ghost (voice)
 For Keeps? (1988) as Mr. Bobrucz
 Illegally Yours (1988) as Hal B. Keeler
 Rented Lips (1988) as Rev. Farrell
 Get Smart, Again! (1989, TV series) as Cmdr. Drury
 Tiny Toon Adventures (1990, TV series) as Flavio (voice) (episode: "Hollywood Plucky")
 Timeless Tales from Hallmark (1991)
 Darkwing Duck (1991, TV series) as Tuskernini (voice)
 Shadows and Fog (1991) as Armstead the Magician
 A Different World (1992) as Homeless Man
 Fievel's American Tails (1992, TV series) as Sweet William
 Swat Kats: The Radical Squadron (1993) as Dr. Wally Gilbert Kenrousch (voice)
 Bonkers (1993, TV series) as Gloomy (voice)
 Animaniacs (1993, TV series) as Ludwig van Beethoven (voice)
 Batman: The Animated Series (1994, TV series) as Richard (voice)
 Star Trek: Deep Space Nine (1994) as Colyus
 Thumbelina (1994) as King Colbert (voice)
 The Land Before Time series (II-XIII) (1994-2008) as Littlefoot’s Grandpa (voice)
 Freakazoid! (1995, TV series) as Dr. Gunter Hunter Hanker (voice)
 Batman: The Animated Series (1995, TV series) as M2 (voice)
 Fallout (1997, Video Game) as Vault 13 Overseer (voice)
 Godzilla: The Series (1998, TV series) as Dr. Alexander Preloran (voice)
 The Little Mermaid II: Return to the Sea (2000) as King Triton (voice)
 Becker (2001, TV series) as Melvin
 Just Shoot Me (2001, TV series) as Horst
 Kingdom Hearts (2002) as King Triton (voice)
 Teddy Bears' Picnic (2002) as Gene Molinari
 Kingdom Hearts II (2006, Video Game) as King Triton (voice)

Discography
Henry the First (1974) - Henry Kissinger

References

External links
 
 

1935 births
2011 deaths
20th-century American male actors
21st-century American male actors
21st-century American comedians
Male actors from Chicago
20th-century American comedians
American male film actors
American male television actors
American male voice actors
American male video game actors
American male comedians
Dunhill Records artists
Deaths from cancer in California
Deaths from pancreatic cancer
People from Granada Hills, Los Angeles
American male comedy actors
Northwestern University alumni